Ricardo Roberto Infante (21 June 1924 – 14 December 2008) was an Argentine football player and manager who played as a striker. He was the second-highest-scoring player in the history of Estudiantes de La Plata and the sixth-highest-scoring player in the professional era of the Primera División Argentina.

Career 
Infante made his professional debut in 1942 for Estudiantes, he scored his first goal for the club on 1 August 1943 in a 2–2 draw with Chacarita Juniors. Infante went on to score 180 goals for the club in 328 games.

One of Infante's greatest moments came on 19 September 1948 in a game against Rosario Central, with Estudiantes already winning 2–0 Infante scored a goal with a right-footed rabona from 35 metres out.

Infante left the club in 1953 after their relegation from the Primera División, he joined Club Atlético Huracán where he played until 1956. He then returned to Estudiantes for a second spell with the club.

In 1958 Infante was part of the Argentina squad that played in the 1958 FIFA World Cup.

In 1960 Estudiantes refused to renew his contract after he suffered a knee injury, prompting him to join fierce local rivals Gimnasia de La Plata. He retired later that year and went on to work as a youth coach in La Plata.

Infante currently occupies sixth place on the list of the Primera División Argentina all-time topscorers with 217 goals in 439 games.

References

External links 
 
 Obituary in El Patagonico

1924 births
2008 deaths
Footballers from La Plata
Argentine footballers
Argentina international footballers
1958 FIFA World Cup players
Association football forwards
Estudiantes de La Plata footballers
Club Atlético Huracán footballers
Club de Gimnasia y Esgrima La Plata footballers
Argentine football managers
Estudiantes de La Plata managers
Argentine Primera División players